224 may refer to:

The year 224
The number 224 - see 224 (number)
The area code 224 - see Area codes 847 and 224
2-2-4, a Whyte notation classification of steam locomotive